Luna (English Moon) is the 9th studio album by Mexican pop singer Ana Gabriel. It was released on November 9, 1993. This material was produced by herself.

Track listing
Tracks:
 Tu Nombre Es Traición
 Luna (Juan Gabriel)
 Pacto de Amor
 Estas Emociones (Ode E Adao)
 Me Estoy Enamorando
 Somos Dos
 Sé Que Te Vas
 Dame Una 
 Eres 
 Vaya Fin de Semana
 Háblame de Frente
 Entre Dos (O Bondade)
 Es

Singles
 Luna (Her 7th #1 for 3 weeks in Hot Latin Songs)
 Estas Emociones
 Háblame de frente

Singles charts
"Luna" reached #1 on Hot Latin Songs.
"Estas Emociones" reached #15 on Hot Latin Songs.
"Háblame de Frente"reached #5 on Hot Latin Songs.

Album chart
This release reached the #9 position in Billboard Top Latin Albums staying for 30 weeks  and it reached the #6 position in the Billboard Latin Pop Albums staying for 26 weeks in the chart.

Sales and certifications

References 

1993 albums
Ana Gabriel albums